Elections in Illinois provide for the election of over 40,000 elected seats across over 6,000 units of government.

In a 2020 study, Illinois was ranked as the 4th easiest state for citizens to vote in.

Election system
Elections in Illinois are directly administered by 109 election authorities.  Seven municipalities each have an election commission as the local election authority only within that municipality.  Outside of those, the county clerk is the local election authority in 100 counties, and 2 counties have a separate election commission.  The local election authority's tasks include taking voter registration, selecting the polling places, ordering the ballots, training the election judges, overseeing the election itself, and supervising the vote count.

The State Board of Elections (SBE) performs certain statewide election functions.  Among its functions are providing uniform instructions, forms, and other material to the election authorities; adopting rules consistent with the other election law in Illinois; and approving the voting machines allowed for use by election authorities in Illinois.  The SBE is also the election authority for accepting candidate petitions and nominations for certain state and national offices and for modifications to the Constitution of Illinois and other statewide referendums.

Elections held

Regular elections
There are four types of regular elections in Illinois: the general primary election and the general election, which occur in even years, and the consolidated primary election and the consolidated election, which occur in odd years.

The election day for the general election is the Tuesday after the first Monday in November of each even year, which is the day usually associated with election day in the United States.  Its associated general primary election is held on the preceding third Tuesday in March.

The election day for the consolidated election is the first Tuesday in April of each odd year, unless that day is during Passover, in which case the election is the first Tuesday after Passover.  Its associated consolidated primary election is held on the preceding last Tuesday in February.  The consolidated election was established in 1982; before this, many local governments held separate elections on unrelated days at unrelated places.

Special elections
Illinois statutes limit special elections to specific circumstances, prohibiting all other elections from being held at any other time than for the regular elections.

Vacancies

United States Congress
If a seat in the United States House of Representatives becomes vacant more than 240 days before the next general election, the governor chooses a date within 180 days and issues a writ of election to hold a special election on the chosen day for that congressional district.

Election judges

Illinois high school student election judges
High school students in many states across the country are permitted to serve as election judges (poll workers) in their states, even when the students are not yet old enough to vote. In the 41 states that allow high school students to serve as election judges, the laws typically allow for students to work if they are 16 years of age and in good academic standing at their schools. Specific requirements vary from state to state. Some states do not allow high school students to serve as election judges, or the law has no specific provisions for persons who are not yet eligible to vote. The following states permit high school students to serve as election judges:  Alaska, Arizona, Arkansas, California, Colorado, Connecticut, Delaware, District of Columbia, Georgia, Guam, Hawaii, Idaho, Illinois, Kansas, Kentucky, Louisiana, Maine, Maryland, Massachusetts, Michigan, Minnesota, Mississippi, Nebraska, Nevada, New Hampshire, New Jersey, New York, North Carolina, North Dakota, Ohio, Oregon, Pennsylvania, Rhode Island, South Carolina, South Dakota, Tennessee, Texas, Utah, Vermont, West Virginia, Wisconsin, and Wyoming.

The State of Illinois, specifically Chicago, has a robust model.  Chicago's contingencies of student judges are the largest in the country. Illinois law provided that students meet the following criteria to serve as Election Judges:
 Be a high school junior or senior in good standing;
 Have a grade point average of at least 3.0 on a 4.0 scale;
 Be a U.S. citizen by Election Day;
 Be able to read, write, and speak English;
 Successfully complete a 4-hour training session;
 Be able to work on Election Day beginning at 5 a.m. until all duties are completed after the polls close;
 Be recommended by his/her high school principal;
 Have the written approval of his/her parent or legal guardian.,

There is no minimum age requirement to serve as a student election judge in Illinois. A maximum of two high school students, 1 from each party, may serve in each precinct.  In the City of Chicago, a partnership between the Chicago Board of Elections and Mikva Challenge, a non-partisan civic engagement organization, has contributed to the Election Board leading the nation in the utilization of student judges.

See also
Politics of Illinois
Political party strength in Illinois
Electoral reform in Illinois
Government of Illinois
United States presidential elections in Illinois
Women's suffrage in Illinois

Statewide offices
 Illinois gubernatorial elections
 Illinois Attorney General elections
 Illinois Comptroller elections

 Elected officials
 Illinois General Assembly
 Illinois Senate
 Illinois House of Representatives
 Governor of Illinois
 Lieutenant Governor of Illinois
 Illinois Treasurer
 Illinois Attorney General
 Illinois Comptroller

References

External links
Illinois State Board of Elections — official website
Illinois Online Voter Application Website — official website: allows voter registration, registration status lookup, and polling place lookup

 

 
Government of Illinois
Political events in Illinois